Richard Tsoi Yiu-cheong (born 11 September 1967) is a Hong Kong politician and the former vice-chairman of the Democratic Party. He ran for many Legislative Council and District Council elections and was elected as Sha Tin District Councillor in 2003. On March 5, 2020, Tsoi resigned from duties after joint petition from colleagues against his criticism of local restaurants being discriminatory towards Mainland Chinese amid the coronavirus epidemic.

Tsoi has been active in many pressure groups and protests of the pro-democracy camp. 

On 18 April 2020, Tsoi was arrested as one of 15 Hong Kong high-profile democracy figures, on suspicion of organizing, publicizing or taking part in several unauthorized assemblies between August and October 2019 in the course of the anti-extradition bill protests. Following protocol, the police statement did not disclose the names of the accused.

Positions held
 Vice Chairman, Democratic Party
 Deputy Convenor, Alliance for Universal Suffrage
 Executive Committee Member, Power for Democracy
 Member, Hong Kong Human Rights Commission
 Executive Committee Member, Amnesty International Hong Kong
 Spokesman, Coalition to Monitor Public Transport and Utilities
 Deputy Convenor, Health Care Policy Forum
 Convenor, The Shatin Union for People's Livelihood
 Chair, Sha Tin Youth Right Association

References

1967 births
Living people
Hong Kong journalists
District councillors of Sha Tin District
Alumni of the Chinese University of Hong Kong
Charter 08 signatories
The Frontier (Hong Kong) politicians
Democratic Party (Hong Kong) politicians
HKFS people